Rockpalast: Blues Rock Legends Vol. 3 is a two-CD live album by guitarist and singer Johnny Winter.  It was recorded on April 21, 1979, at the Grugahalle in Essen, Germany.  It was released in Germany by MIG Records on February 25, 2011.  It was also released as a concert video on DVD.

This performance was originally broadcast live on the television show Rockpalast.  The concert that night was by the J. Geils Band, followed by Patti Smith, and then Johnny Winter.

Critical reception
Red Lick said, "... it's your usual Winter performance with frenzied clusters of powerful notes, tons of terrific solos, hard grinding rhythm guitar and croaky vocals bawled out at full volume until Johnny and the audience are exhausted and delirious."

Track listing
Disc 1
"Hideaway" (Freddie King) – 11:02
"Messin' with the Kid" (Mel London) – 7:47
"Walking By Myself" (Jimmy Rogers) – 8:27
"Mississippi Blues" (traditional, arranged by Johnny Winter) – 18:12
"Divin' Duck" (Sleepy John Estes) – 6:33
"Johnny B. Goode" (Chuck Berry) – 6:53
Disc 2
"Suzie Q" (Dale Hawkins, Stan Lewis, Eleanor Broadwater) – 13:14
Drum solo (Bob Torello) – 10:43
"I'm Ready" (Pearl King, Ruth Durand, Joe Robichaux) – 5:48
"Rockabilly Boogie" (traditional, arranged by Winter) – 6:06
Medley (Winter) – 15:26
"Jumpin' Jack Flash" (Mick Jagger, Keith Richards) – 7:50

Personnel
Musicians
Johnny Winter – guitar, vocals
Jon Paris – bass
Bob Torello – drums
Production
Egon Bröse – sound recording
Hoppi – audio mastering
Ernst Höller – technical director
Wilhelm Lang – production manager
Peter Rüchel – executive producer, liner notes
Manfred Becker – photos

References

Johnny Winter albums
2011 live albums